is a Japanese gravure idol, tarento and radio personality from LesPros Entertainment. She is from Kitami, Hokkaido, and is a second generation member (number 16) of the idol group Idoling. Her nickname is 'Amimi'.

Since her graduation from Idoling, Kikuchi has made numerous appearances as a television personality on various variety programs.

On February 1, 2018, Kikuchi announced her marriage to a non celebrity man.  She gave birth to her first child, a daughter on August 24, 2020.

Filmography

TV Shows (Regular) 
 Idoling!!! - Idoling #16 (April 2008) Fuji TV 
 News!371~Idol (April 2009- March 2010) Enta!371
 Shouri no Megami 5 (January 2010) Chiba TV
 Sweet Den of Premiere - (October 2011) Fuji TV

Radio shows 
 Kikuchi Ami no 1ami9 (October 2009) Radio Nippon

Image Videos 
 Angel Kiss ~Smile Paradise~ (2008)
 Angel Kiss ~Amimi no Smile Party~ (2009）
 Kikuchi Ami desu!!! (2009）
 ami4you ~Kikuchi janai-yo, Kukuchi dayo. (2010）
 Magical☆Switch (2010）

Film 
 Everything Will Be Owlright! (2022)

Bibliography

Photographs 
 Ami-ing (March 2012)

Trading Cards 
 Amimirakuru (January 2010)

References

External links 

 Agency profile - 
 Idoling!!! - Idol searching show where she debuted.
 Official blog

Japanese idols
Japanese television personalities
People from Kitami, Hokkaido
1990 births
Living people
Idoling!!! members